The Derde Divisie, formerly known as Topklasse, is the fourth tier of football in the Netherlands, which had its inaugural season as a third tier in 2010–11 and as a fourth tier in 2016–17. The league is placed between the Tweede Divisie and the Vierde Divisie (formerly Hoofdklasse), the third and fifth tiers of Dutch football, respectively. The introduction of the then Topklasse resulted from discussions between the Royal Dutch Football Association, the Coöperatie Eerste Divisie (the clubs in the Eerste Divisie) and the Centraal Overleg Hoofdklassers (the clubs in the Hoofdklasse).

Background 

A national football competition in the Netherlands was established in 1956. Prior to that, the districts of the Dutch football association held their own competitions, and the champions of these competitions faced each other for the national title. The highest national division in the new league structure became the Eredivisie, followed by the Eerste Divisie and the Tweede Divisie. The Tweede Divisie was disbanded in 1971; six clubs were promoted to the Eerste Divisie (champions De Volewijckers along with FC Eindhoven, VVV, Fortuna Vlaardingen, PEC and Roda JC), while the remaining ten clubs became amateur clubs. The Eerste Divisie subsequently became the lowest league in professional football in the Netherlands.

The amateur football clubs had a separate league system, the highest league of which was the Eerste Klasse (later: Hoofdklasse). There was no promotion and relegation between professional football and amateur football; a professional football club could only drop to the amateur leagues if its licence for professional football was revoked, while an amateur football club could only be promoted after application and meeting a number of criteria.

The calls for a Topklasse largely stemmed from the professionalization of amateur football clubs in the Netherlands in recent years, in the sense that many Hoofdklasse club players now receive a salary. This has closed the gap between the top of the Hoofdklasse and the bottom of the Eerste Divisie. Chairman of the Dutch football association Henk Kesler had therefore repeatedly called for the creation of the Topklasse to establish promotion and relegation between professional and amateur football, creating a league pyramid akin to the English football league system.

The first plans for a Topklasse were rejected by the Eerste Divisie clubs in 1999.

Confirmed structure 

The new league structure was approved at an amateur clubs meeting on 6 June 2009. The KNVB introduced the new level for the 2010–11 season, comprising 32 clubs. After the 2009–10 season, the bottom 2 teams in the Eerste Divisie, whose size was reduced from 20 to 18 clubs, and the top four clubs from each of the six Hoofdklasse divisions – a total of 26 clubs – automatically joined the new level. These clubs were joined by six playoff winners from a pool of 12 clubs that finished in 5th or 6th place in their group within the Hoofdklasse.

The 32 clubs within the Topklasse were divided into two leagues comprising 16 clubs. One league is a "Saturday" league and the other a "Sunday" league, a setup that is still in place. At the end of the season, both clubs that finished at the top of their division play each other. The winner of that tie was promoted to the Eerste Divisie, replacing the team that finished 18th. If the winner refused promotion or was ineligible for promotion, the runners-up were promoted. If both teams refused promotion, no promotion and relegation took place between the Eerste Divisie and Topklasse.

In January 2010, the exclusion of bankrupt HFC Haarlem from the Eerste Divisie reduced the number of scheduled relegations to one only, and led the KNVB to announce that this vacancy would be filled by an additional Hoofdklasse club.
On 12 May 2010, it was announced that BV Veendam had declared bankruptcy, possibly giving (otherwise relegated) FC Oss a chance to stay in the Eerste Divisie, with the extra slot filled by another Hoofdklasse club. Veendam's bankruptcy was then reversed on appeal, thus confirming FC Oss' relegation into the Topklasse.

After the 2015–16 season promotion to the reintroduced Tweede Divisie, placed between the Eerste Divisie and the Topklasse, renamed Derde Divisie, was implemented. Thus, the Derde Divisie and lower leagues were decremented by one step in the pyramid, with the latter expanding to 36 clubs, 18 in each division. The division winners are promoted and no longer compete for the amateur championship which was made redundant.

Reforms from the 2016–17 season 
There were several reforms from the 2016–17 season. The league was reformed as follows:

A proposal to split the two divisions determined by region and not by playing date has been rejected.

Perception among amateur clubs 
IJsselmeervogels, one of the most successful amateur football clubs in the Netherlands, was a strong opponent of the plans; chief Arian van de Vuurst has stated that "professional football does not fit in with our culture." Because of these objections, promotion to the Eerste Divisie was not mandatory for the champion of the former Topklasse. After 2016, however, promotion to the Tweede Divisie is required.

Current teams (2021–22)

Saturday League

Sunday League

Champions

References

External links
derdedivisie.org - Latest news from and about the Derde Divisie. 
League321.com - Dutch football league tables, records & statistics database. 

 
4
Sports leagues established in 2009
2009 establishments in the Netherlands
Neth